Albasu is a Local Government Area in Kano State, Nigeria. Its headquarters are in the town of Albasu.

It has an area of 398 km² and a population of 190,153 at the 2006 census.

The postal code of the area is 712.

References

Local Government Areas in Kano State